The 1982 World Women's Handball Championship took place in Hungary between 2-12 December 1982.

Qualification
Host nation
 

Qualified from the 1980 Summer Olympics
 
 
 

Qualified from the 1981 World Championship B
 
 
 
 
 

Qualified from the 1981 African Women's Handball Championship
 

Qualified from Asia
 

Qualified from the Americas

Preliminary round

Group A

Group B

Group C

Final round

Group 7-12

Final Group

Final standings

References

 International Handball Federation

World Handball Championship tournaments
World Women's Handball Championship, 1982
World Women's Handball Championship, 1982
W
Women's handball in Hungary
December 1982 sports events in Europe